is a former Japanese football player.

Playing career
Mizuno was born in Chiba Prefecture on August 7, 1974. After graduating from high school, he joined his local club JEF United Ichihara in 1993. Although he played several matches in 1994 and 1995, he could not play many matches. In 1997, he moved to Japan Football League club Mito HollyHock with teammate Teppei Isaka. He played as regular player from 1998. In 1999, the club won the 3rd place and was promoted to J2 League. His opportunity to play decreased in 2000 and he retired end of 2000 season.

Club statistics

References

External links

junn-chang-futebol.seesaa.net 

1974 births
Living people
Association football people from Chiba Prefecture
Japanese footballers
J1 League players
J2 League players
Japan Football League (1992–1998) players
Japan Football League players
JEF United Chiba players
Mito HollyHock players
Association football midfielders